Saint Luke African Methodist Episcopal Church is a historic church at 900 New York Street in Lawrence, Kansas, United States.  It was built in 1910 and added to the National Register of Historic Places in 2005.

It is mainly a one-story building  in plan.

References

Churches in Lawrence, Kansas
Gothic Revival church buildings in Kansas
Methodist churches in Kansas
Churches on the National Register of Historic Places in Kansas
Churches completed in 1910
National Register of Historic Places in Douglas County, Kansas
African Methodist Episcopal churches